The 1936 Railway Cup Hurling Championship was the 10th staging of the Railway Cup since its establishment by the Gaelic Athletic Association in 1927. The cup began on 16 February 1936 and ended on 17 March 1936.

Munster were the defending champions.

On 17 March 1936, Leinster won the cup following a 2-08 to 3-04 defeat of Munster in the final at Croke Park. This was their fifth Railway Cup title overall and their first title since 1933.

Teams

Results

Semi-final

Final

Sources

 Donegan, Des, The Complete Handbook of Gaelic Games (DBA Publications Limited, 2005).

References

Railway Cup Hurling Championship
Railway Cup Hurling Championship